Petra Kulichová (born 13 September 1984) is a Czech basketball player who competed in the 2004 Summer Olympics, the 2008 Summer Olympics and the 2012 Summer Olympics.

References

1984 births
Living people
Basketball players at the 2004 Summer Olympics
Basketball players at the 2008 Summer Olympics
Basketball players at the 2012 Summer Olympics
Beşiktaş women's basketball players
Botaş SK players
Centers (basketball)
Czech expatriate basketball people in Turkey
Czech women's basketball players
Olympic basketball players of the Czech Republic
Sportspeople from Pardubice